Roy Odiaka (born 22 March 1992) is a former French footballer of Nigerian descent who played as a forward. He last played for Universitatea Cluj.

Club career
Odiaka's career began with AFC Garenne Colombes, who he featured for in the youth ranks. At the age of 16, Odiaka was handed the opportunity of a trial with Norwich City. He featured for the Under-18s in a fixture with Norfolk County in August 2008, in which he scored twice. However, he later joined Dulwich Hamlet before a move to the Canaries could progress.

In July 2010, Odiaka was snapped up by Crystal Palace and he headed into the Under-21s. He went on to line-up for Stoke City Under-21s on three occasions, scoring once. With his first taste of action coming in a 5-1 defeat to Newcastle United on 3 September 2012, a debut goal would also be his only goal for the club. Following a 7-2 defeat to Tottenham Hotspur, his final appearance came in against Southampton in early October.

After failing to impress, he joined non-league outfit Beckenham Town in February 2012. Scoring one goal for the club, in a 3-0 win over Rochester United, he later joined Isthmian League Division One South club Walton Casuals for a short spell. Following four appearances, in which he failed to find the net, he joined local rivals Walton & Hersham.

Odiaka then moved to Romania to play in Liga I, joining Universitatea Cluj. After a successful trial earlier in the month, in which manager Ionel Ganea took less than 24 hours to offer a deal, he made his professional debut on 21 July 2013, replacing Cătălin Dedu at half-time in a 1-0 defeat to Petrolul Ploiești. Despite signing a three-year contract, he managed just a further three appearances before having his contract terminated on 10 September 2013.

Due to family relations, Odiaka was eligible to represent Nigeria, France or Senegal national teams.

References

External links

1992 births
Living people
Sportspeople from Colombes
Dulwich Hamlet F.C. players
Beckenham Town F.C. players
Walton Casuals F.C. players
Walton & Hersham F.C. players
FC Universitatea Cluj players
Liga I players
Association football forwards
French footballers
French expatriate footballers
Expatriate footballers in Romania
French expatriate sportspeople in Romania
French people of Nigerian descent
Expatriate footballers in England
French expatriate sportspeople in England
Footballers from Hauts-de-Seine